Ivor Fox-Strangways Guest, 3rd Viscount Wimborne (2 December 1939 – 17 December 1993) was a British peer.

Early life
Ivor Fox-Strangways Guest was born on 2 December 1939. He was the son of Ivor Grosvenor Guest, 2nd Viscount Wimborne (1903–1967), and Mabel Edith Fox-Strangways, who married in 1938.  William Walton composed "Set me as a seal upon thine heart" for his parents' wedding. His maternal grandfather was Giles Fox-Strangways, 6th Earl of Ilchester (1874–1959).  His paternal grandfather was Ivor Guest, 1st Viscount Wimborne (1873–1939), who was a British politician and one of the last Lords Lieutenant of Ireland, serving in that position at the time of the Easter Rising in 1916.  He was educated at Eton College, like his father.

Personal life
He was married twice. The first was on 20 December 1966, when he married Victoria Ann Vigors. Together they had:
Ivor Mervyn Vigors Guest, 4th Viscount Wimborne (born 1968), who married Ieva Imsa.

He later married Venetia Margaret Barker (nee Quarry); his sister-in-law was Miranda Macmillan, Countess of Stockton (1947-2020). Together, they had: 
Ilona Charlotte Guest (born 1985), who married Oliver Hilton-Johnson in 2012.

His widow, now Dowager Viscountess Wimborne, lives at Fontaine-l'Abbé, France.

References

External links
"UK: Is the next generation of industrialists unwilling to take the baton?", Management Today, 1 February 1991.

1939 births
1993 deaths
People educated at Eton College
Viscounts in the Peerage of the United Kingdom
Ivor